Banzo may refer to:
Brazilian slaves' feeling of banzo related to homesickness, akin to Welsh hiraeth
Eduardo López Banzo, Spanish conductor
Charan Banzo, Indian film music composer for the film Lodde